Alexis Wawanoloath (born July 15, 1982) is a Canadian politician. He was a member of National Assembly of Quebec for the riding of Abitibi-Est, representing the Parti Québécois. He is a member of the Abenaki First Nation.

The son of Christine Sioui-Wawanoloath and Gaston Larouche and descendant of Gray Lock, he studied at the Cégep de l'Abitibi-Témiscamingue. Wawanoloath worked as a technician in social work at the l'Or-et-des-Bois School Board, an educator at a child daycare centre and a host for the Centre polyvalent pour jeunes autochthones in Val-d'Or. He was the president of the youth aboriginal council and an administrator at the Abitibi-Témiscamingue youth forum.

Wawanoloath became the first aboriginal member ever elected to the National Assembly since Ludger Bastien, defeating Liberal incumbent Pierre Corbeil in the 2007 elections. He was named the PQ critic for youth by André Boisclair. He ran again in the 2008 election and was defeated by Corbeil.

On December 1, 2013, he was elected as councillor in the Abenakis of Odanak council.

References

External links
 PQ webpage 

1982 births
Living people
Parti Québécois MNAs
People from Val-d'Or
Abenaki people
First Nations politicians
Francophone Quebec people
21st-century Canadian politicians